Peter Bernd Schneider (born 9 January 1953 in Karlsruhe) is a German mathematician, specializing in the p-adic aspects of algebraic number theory, arithmetic algebraic geometry, and representation theory.

Education and career
Peter Schneider studied mathematics in Karlsruhe and Erlangen. After his Diplom in 1977 from the University of Erlangen-Nuremberg, he was an assistant from 1977 to 1983 at the University of Regensburg. There he received in 1980 his PhD with advisor Jürgen Neukirch and dissertation Die Galoiscohomologie -adischer Darstellungen über Zahlkörpern (The Galois cohomology of -adic representations of number fields). Schneider habilitated in 1982 at the University of Regensburg. He was a postdoc at Harvard University for the academic year 1983–1984 and a C2-professor at Heidelberg University for the academic year 1984–1985. He was a C4-professor from 1985 to 1994 at the University of Cologne and is since 1994 a C-4 professor at the University of Münster.

His research includes Iwasawa theory, special values of -functions. and  -adic representations (in the latter subject he has collaborated extensively with Jeremy Teitelbaum).

In 1992 Schneider, together with Christopher Deninger, Michael Rapoport and Thomas Zink, received the Gottfried Wilhelm Leibniz Prize for their work in using arithmetic-algebraic geometry to solve  Diophantine equations. In 2006 he was an invited speaker with talk  Continuous representation theory of p-adic Lie groups at the International Congress of Mathematicians in Madrid. In 2016 he was elected a member of the German National Academy of Sciences Leopoldina and the Academia Europaea.

Selected publications

Articles
 with U. Stuhler: 
 with U. Stuhler: 
 with J. Teitelbaum: 
 with J. Teitelbaum:

Books
 
 p-adic Lie groups, Grundlehren der mathematischen Wissenschaften, Springer Verlag, 2011
 
 Galois Representations and (φ,Γ)-modules. Vol. 164. Cambridge University Press, 2017 
 as editor, with Norbert Schappacher and Michael Rapoport: Beilinson’s conjectures on special values of L-functions, Academic Press, Boston 1988,  (Oberwolfach-Tagung; Perspectives in Mathematics 4); 2014 reprint
 as editor, with John H. Coates, Sujatha Ramdorai, and Otmar Venjakob:

References

External links
 

20th-century German mathematicians
21st-century German mathematicians
Arithmetic geometers
University of Erlangen-Nuremberg alumni
University of Regensburg alumni
Academic staff of the University of Münster
Gottfried Wilhelm Leibniz Prize winners
Members of Academia Europaea
1953 births
Living people
Members of the German Academy of Sciences Leopoldina